

England

Head coach: Geoff Cooke

 Rob Andrew
 Will Carling
 Les Cusworth
 Wade Dooley
 Simon Halliday
 Richard Harding
 Mike Harrison (c) *
 Nigel Melville (c) *
 Brian Moore
 John Orwin
 Chris Oti
 Jeff Probyn
 Gary Rees
 Paul Rendall
 Dean Richards
 Kevin Simms
 Mickey Skinner
 Rory Underwood
 Jon Webb
 Peter Winterbottom

 captain in the first two games
 captain in the last two games

France

Head coach: Jacques Fouroux

 Marc Andrieu
 Louis Armary
 Pierre Berbizier
 Philippe Bérot
 Serge Blanco
 Éric Bonneval
 Didier Camberabero
 Alain Carminati
 Marc Cécillon
 Éric Champ
 Jean Condom
 Daniel Dubroca (c)
 Dominique Erbani
 Jean-Pierre Garuet-Lempirou
 Jean-Baptiste Lafond
 Patrice Lagisquet
 Jean-Patrick Lescarboura
 Alain Lorieux
 Franck Mesnel
 Pascal Ondarts
 Jean-Charles Orso
 Laurent Rodriguez
 Philippe Sella
 Jean Paul Trille

Ireland

Head coach: Jim Davidson

 Willie Anderson
 Michael Bradley
 Tom Clancy
 Keith Crossan
 Phil Danaher
 Paul Dean
 Des Fitzgerald
 John Fitzgerald
 Mike Gibson
 Michael Kiernan
 Terry Kingston
 Donal Lenihan (c)
 Hugo MacNeill
 Phillip Matthews
 Denis McBride
 Michael Moylet
 Brendan Mullin
 Trevor Ringland
 William Sexton
 Don Whittle

Scotland

Head coach: Jim Telfer

 Roger Baird
 Finlay Calder
 Gary Callander (c)
 Alister Campbell
 Richard Cramb
 Damian Cronin
 Matt Duncan
 Gavin Hastings
 Scott Hastings
 John Jeffrey
 Andrew Ker
 Roy Laidlaw
 Iain Paxton
 Keith Robertson
 Norrie Rowan
 David Sole
 Alan Tait
 Iwan Tukalo
 Derek Turnbull
 Derek White

Wales

Head coach: Tony Gray

 Bleddyn Bowen (c)
 Anthony Buchanan
 Tony Clement
 Richie Collins
 Jonathan Davies
 Ieuan Evans
 Adrian Hadley
 Robert Jones
 Staff Jones
 Phil May
 Paul Moriarty
 Bob Norster
 Kevin Phillips
 Rowland Phillips
 Jeremy Pugh
 Mark Ring
 Paul Thorburn
 Ian Watkins
 Glen Webbe

Six Nations Championship squads